Erbiceni is a commune in Iași County, Western Moldavia, Romania. It is composed of five villages: Bârlești, Erbiceni, Spinoasa, Sprânceana and Totoești.

Natives
Constantin Erbiceanu
Marius Simionescu

References

Communes in Iași County
Localities in Western Moldavia